The following highways are numbered 12A:

India
  National Highway 12A (India)

United States
 New England Interstate Route 12A (former)
 County Road 12A (Gadsden County, Florida)
 County Road 12A (Liberty County, Florida)
 Nebraska Spur 12A
 New Hampshire Route 12A
 County Route 12A (Monmouth County, New Jersey)
 New York State Route 12A
 County Route 12A (Chenango County, New York)
 Vermont Route 12A
 Secondary State Highway 12A (Washington) (former)